Gualaca   is a corregimiento in Gualaca District, Chiriquí Province, Panama. It is the seat of Gualaca District. Its population as of 1990 was 4,099; its population as of 2000 was 4,430.

References

Corregimientos of Chiriquí Province